Exhibition drill is a variant of drill that involves complex marching sequences which usually deviate from drill used in the course of ordinary parades. Teams performing exhibition drill are often affiliated with military units, but the scope of exhibition drill is not limited to military drill teams. Exhibition drill is often performed by Armed Forces Precision Drill Teams, the drill teams at service academies and ROTC and JROTC units, and civilian drill teams that perform at parades, drill meets, and half-time shows and other public venues.

History of rifle exhibition drill

The first documented performance of exhibition drill was performed by Hadji Cheriff and filmed at what is believed to be the Midway Plaisance of the 1893 World's Columbian Exposition in Chicago, Illinois. The film was later copyrighted by Thomas Edison in 1899, entitled The Arabian Gun Twirler.

The performance demonstrates aerial (two ) and over-the-shoulder techniques,  and 

It is believed that the weapon was a .577 caliber, triple band 1853 Enfield Musket, which is 56" long and weighs about 9.5 pounds and thus is 13" longer and heavier than most drill weapons used today.

Exhibition drill in competition 
Exhibition drill is one of many different drill phases that are a part of a drill meet. Other phases include Inspection, Color Guard and Regulation Drill.

Exhibition military drill has grown drastically in popularity in recent decades. This growth can be attributed to several primary factors. These include:

 The expansion of Junior ROTC programs through the four primary service branches that occurred in the early and mid 1980s took the total number of units from roughly 1,600 to well over 2,500 in the U.S. This provided more cadets the opportunity to be a part of these exhibition drill teams. 
 The work of Sports Network International (SNI) produced military drill and ceremony competitions on a scale that had never previously been seen. 
 From these numerous competitions, SNI produced magazines and websites to feature this activity. SNI also produced training and entertainment videos devoted exclusively to featuring many of the military exhibition drill teams in the country. These videos allowed the talent and creativity involved in exhibition drill at the highest levels to travel and expand at a greater rate, helping to promote the sport.

General rules and guidelines

Rules of exhibition drill during competitions vary, but most of them apply the following guidelines:

Time – There is usually a minimum and maximum time a routine may take. Points are deducted if a team is under or over time.

Boundaries – Teams should be aware of their boundary lines, and if necessary, alter their routines as to not cross the boundary lines. Points are deducted if a person crosses a boundary line.

Some high-school level competitions prevent cadets who are participating in armed drill events from performing more dangerous 'over the head' spins, or raising cadets off the floor, in the interest of safety.

High school
Some high school drill teams compete at the National High School Drill Team Championships in Daytona Beach, Florida, and generally use demilitarized Springfield M1903s, M1 Garands, M-14 rifles and Daisy Drill Rifles. There are also national drill level competitions for JROTC divisions, including Navy JROTC, Army JROTC, Marine Corps JROTC, and Air Force JROTC. Other countries have their own drill team competitions for teenagers.

Unarmed
In an unarmed division, exhibition drill may consist of intricate precision marching, along with various hand movements. Modified step team routines are used in some competitions.

College ROTC drill teams
Colleges with Reserve Officers' Training Corps (ROTC) units, as well as military academies, have drill teams normally train and compete in two types of drill events: Regulation/Close Order and Exhibition (Trick or Fancy) Drill.  Regulation Drill is conducted in accordance with Field Manual 22-5 (now FM 3-21.5) Drill and Ceremonies.  Exhibition Drill is more free form and often more elaborate then Regulation Drill. Exhibition Drill teams are also more colorful in uniform and weaponry. In both types of event, participants are typically armed with weapons made safe or inert by removal of firing pins. Armament is totally devoid of all firing mechanisms for the safety of participants and audience alike.

Pershing Rifles, founded in 1894, is the oldest continuously operating college organization dedicated to military drill.  The original drill team created by John J. Pershing had a simple goal: to serve as an example for the cadets at the University of Nebraska, who were sorely lacking in esprit de corps, motivation, and basic military skills. A typical unit performs as a color guard, exhibition drill team, honor guard, funeral detail, or any other ceremonial unit requested; these services are usually at the request of the local ROTC detachment or school, but are sometimes requested by alumni, local governments, or active duty military units. Pershing Rifles hosts a National Drill Competition each spring which attracts some of the finest college level drill teams in the nation.
Gator Guard Drill Team is a precision drill team and military fraternity based at the University of Florida. It is named after the Florida Gators, the mascot of the University of Florida. Founded in 1953, the Gator Guard absorbed and succeeded the University of Florida's Army ROTC chapter of the Pershing Rifles upon its inception. The Gator Guard performs annually at the university's Homecoming Parade, as well as the Krewe of Mid-City and King Rex parades at the New Orleans Mardi Gras. The team uses M1903 rifles with 8-inch bayonets for all performances. The Gator Guard also performs color guard ceremonies for the University of Florida, the SEC, and the MLB.

Outside the United States

 The Norwegian Army has a silent drill platoon in the Kings Guard, performing in foreign tattoos like Edinburgh.
 The French Republican Guard also has a famous exhibition drill unit.
 Another example can be found in the Singapore Armed Forces Military Police Command's Silent Precision Drill Squad.
 The Malaysian counterpart for these teams is the Provost Drill Team of the Royal Malaysian Navy.
 The Italian Navy recently implemented a silent drill platoon (Plotone Alta Rappresentanza) as a part of the San Marco Marine Brigade.
 The Russian 154th Preobrazhensky Independent Commandant's Regiment's honour guard battalion also serves as a drill unit. It performs exhibition drill or плац концерт. Similar to their Russian counterparts, all personnel of the Honor Guard of the Armed Forces of Belarus are capable of performing exhibition drill routines in addition to their ceremonial role. This practice also applies to the post-Soviet states in Ukraine, Armenia and Kazakhstan.
 The Baltic republics of Estonia, Latvia and Lithuania has practiced many exhibition drills but they do not follow the Russian or Soviet drill procedures due to the Occupation of the Baltic states by the Soviet Union.
 The Canadian National Drill Team of the Ceremonial Guard and the 2nd Battalion, Royal 22nd Regiment serves as a drill unit for the Canadian Armed Forces (CAF). The Royal Military College of Canada also maintain a silent drill team which engages in rifles and sword drill. The branches of the Canadian Cadet Organizations, which include of the Royal Canadian Army Cadets, Royal Canadian Sea Cadets, and the Royal Canadian Air Cadets, have drill competitions throughout the year for their exhibition drill teams.
 The Armed Forces of Malta Drill Team and the Malta Police Precision Drill Team serve as drill units in the Republic of Malta.
 The Queen's Colour Squadron of the British Royal Air Force Regiment is the sole ceremonial unit in the Royal Air Force that has provided displays of exhibition drill which are performed without a single word of command.
 The Fort Henry Guard is an entirely civilian exhibition drill organization, consisting of Canadian high school and university students who are trained to perform at the Fort Henry National Historic Site.

See also
Drill team
Foot drill
War dance
Weapon dance
United States Marine Corps Silent Drill Platoon
French Republican Guard
Blue Ridge Rifles
Friedrich Wilhelm von Steuben

References

 U.S. Army Field Manual, TC 3-21.5, Drill and Ceremonies, Department of the Army (2009).
 Lockhart, Paul Douglas. The drillmaster of Valley Forge: The Baron de Steuben and the making of the American Army. HarperCollins, New York 2008. 
 The Encyclopedia Of Military History: From 3500 B.C. To The Present. (2nd Revised Edition 1986), R. Ernest Dupuy, and Trevor N. Dupuy.
 The Triphibian Guard Honor Guard and Drill Team, Courtesy of Msgr. William Noé Field Archives and Special Collections Center, Seton Hall University, S. Orange, New Jersey, February 2010 and Delozier, Alan, et al. "History of Seton Hall". Walsh Library Archives.  
 U.S. Army ROTC, authorized by, National Defense Act (Text) from Emergency Legislation Passed Prior to December, 1917. United States Dept. of Justice, Joshua Reuben Clark. Published by Govt. Print. Off., 1918
 The National Defense Act of 1916, as amended, referred to in subsec. (d), is act June 3, 1916, ch. 134, 39 Stat. 166, as amended, which was classified generally throughout former Title 10, Army and Air Force. The Act was repealed by act Aug. 10, 1956, ch. 1041, § 53, 70A Stat. 641, and the provisions thereof were reenacted as parts of Title 10, Armed Forces, United States Code.
 "Advocates for ROTC". http://www.advocatesforrotc.org. Retrieved 2006-11-23.  
 "AR 145-1 (Reserve Officers' Training Corps)". Army Regulation. United States Army. 1996. . Retrieved 2006-11-16.  
 "10 USC 2111a". United States Code. Legal Information Institute. https://www.law.cornell.edu/uscode/text/10/2111a-. Retrieved 2006-11-16.
 Triphibian Guard ("Tri Phi's") at Seton Hall University, 1959–1979, http://triphibianguard.blogspot.com/2010/02/triphibian-guard-seton-hall-university.html
 "Distinguished Military Graduate (DMG)", Department of the Army, Pamphlet 640–1, Personnel Records and Identification of Individuals Officers' Guide to the Officer Record Brief, Section III, Military Service Data, TABLE 8, ROTC-DISTINGUISHED MILITARY GRADUATE, http://www.apd.army.mil/pdffiles/p640_1.pdf;  see also: https://web.archive.org/web/20110903211006/http://www.utexas.edu/cola/depts/arotc/cadets/Awards.php

External links
 Queen's Colour Squadron official site
 RAF Regiment Queen's Colour Squadron Precision drill at Edinburgh Military Tattoo 2004
 The United States Army Drill Team "The Old Guard" at the Edinburgh Military Tattoo
 The Indian Air Force drill team perform during passing out parade
 Triphibian Guard at Seton Hall University (1959–1979)
 Canadian National Drill Team 2008 Kingston Performance
 Malta Police Precision Drill Team

Competitions
Military life
Military ceremonies